Bridgeford or Bridgford may refer to:

People 
 Kim Bridgeford, an American poet

Places 
 Great Bridgeford, Staffordshire, United Kingdom
 West Bridgford, Nottinghamshire, United Kingdom
 East Bridgford, Nottinghamshire, United Kingdom
 Bridgeford, Saskatchewan, Canada